Jersey General Hospital in Saint Helier is the only hospital on the island of Jersey.  It has 219 beds.

Medical students are placed at the hospital by the Wessex Deanery of Health Education England.

History
It was originally a poorhouse. The foundation stone was laid in 1765 but the building was requestioned by the military in 1779 as there was no barracks on the island.  It was used as a hospital poorhouse from 1793. The building was largely destroyed by fire in 1859.  Until 1868, when St Saviour's Hospital was opened, it also served as a lunatic asylum.

There were plans to replace it with  a single-site facility at Overdale costed at £804 million but in November 2022 it was reported that the plans were now for a hybrid General Hospital spread across the existing Gloucester Street site, adjacent land at Kensington Place, and Overdale.

Facilities

 Rheumatology
 Maternity
 Special care baby unit (SCBU)
 Emergency Department
 Paediatrics
 Assisted reproduction
 Dermatology
 Blood donation
 Ear, Nose and Throat (ENT)
 Endoscopy
 Cardiology
 Dental
 Dietetics
 Pharmacy
 Renal
 Joint replacement
 Memory
 Neurology
 Occupational therapy (OT)
 Pain clinic
 Speech and language therapy
 Intensive care unit (ITU)
 Radiology

Some patients have to travel to UK hospitals for specialised treatment.

References

External links 

 Hospital wards - Government of Jersey

Hospitals in Jersey
Poor law infirmaries